Dinhata Railway Station serves the city of Dinhata lying in Alipurduar–Bamanhat branch line, Cooch Behar district of West Bengal. The station lies under Alipurduar railway division of Northeast Frontier Railway zone.

Trains

Major Trains
Sealdah-Bamanhat Uttar Banga Express
Siliguri Bamanhat Intercity Express.

References

Railway junction stations in West Bengal
Alipurduar railway division